Anolis bartschi, also known commonly as the Pinar Del Rio cliff anole, western cliff anole, and the west Cuban anole, is a species of lizard in the family Dactyloidae. The species is endemic to Cuba.

Description
It is one of only two anoles that completely lack a dewlap (both sexes), the other being the Cuban stream anole (A. vermiculatus).

Geographic range
A. bartschi is native to western Cuba (Pinar del Río Province).

Habitat
The preferred natural habitat of A. bartschi is forest in limestone karst areas.

Reproduction
A. bartschi is oviparous. It is among the relatively few anole species in which females may lay their eggs together, forming a communal nest in cavities in a steep cliff.

Etymology
The specific name, bartschi, is in honor of zoologist Paul Bartsch, who collected the holotype.

See also
List of Anolis lizards

References

Further reading
Cochran DM (1928). "A Second Species of Deiroptyx from Cuba". Proceedings of the Biological Society of Washington 41: 169–170. (Deiroptyx bartschi, new species).
Schwartz A, Thomas R (1975). A Check-list of West Indian Amphibians and Reptiles. Carnegie Museum of Natural History Special Publication No. 1. Pittsburgh: Carnegie Museum of Natural History. 216 pp. (Anolis bartschi, p. 70).

Anoles
Lizards of the Caribbean
Endemic fauna of Cuba
Reptiles of Cuba
Reptiles described in 1928
Taxa named by Doris Mable Cochran